Oxytalan fibers are elastic-like fibers that run parallel to the tooth surface and bend to attach to cementum. Fibrillin builds the oxytalan fibers, which causes the elastic behavior. 

In the cellular anatomy of teeth, oxytalan fibres are a component of the extracellular matrix. They were first described by Fullmer & Lillie (1958) in periodontal membranes.  On light microscope examination, these fibres may be distinguished from mature elastic fibers by their failure to stain with aldehyde fuchsin solutions, unless they have been oxidized by potassium permanganate, performic acid or peracetic acid. 

Under electron microscopy they appear to be composed of microfibrillar units, 7–20 nm in diameter with a periodicity of 12–17 nm. 

From their morphology, localization and staining properties it seems likely that these fibers are an immature form of elastic tissue.

They can be found on the surface of smooth muscles. They are largely associated with blood vessels.

Notes

Teeth